Marquis Li may refer to:

Marquis Li of Cai (died 863 BC)
Marquis Li of Jin (died 859 BC)
Marquis Xi of Jin (died 823 BC), can also be romanized as Marquis Li of Jin
Marquis Xi of Cai (died 761 BC), can also be romanized as Marquis Li of Cai
Yu Jin (died 221), Cao Wei general, posthumously honored as Marquis Li

See also
Duke Li (disambiguation)
Marquis Xi (disambiguation)